Kalamaria is an under-construction metro station serving Thessaloniki Metro's Line 2. It is expected to enter service in 2023.

The station gets its name from the area of Thessaloniki it serves, Kalamaria. It is a municipality making up the Thessaloniki urban area, and the name is a corruption of either the Medieval Greek Καλή Μεριά (kali meria, good side) or "Σκάλα Μεριά" (skala meria, port side).

References

See also
List of Thessaloniki Metro stations

Thessaloniki Metro